Heinig is a German surname. Notable people with the surname include:

Katrin Dörre-Heinig (born 1961), former athlete from Germany, who competed mainly in the marathon
Kurt Heinig (born 1886), German lithograph, politician and journalist
Marcel Heinig (born 1981), German extreme sportsman who has his greatest success in decatriathlons
Stefan Heinig (born 1962), CEO of the major German company KiK Textilien und Non-Food GmbH from Bönen (Germany)

German-language surnames